Helical plc (formerly Helical Bar plc) is a property investment and development company. Helical is based in London and a constituent of the FTSE SmallCap Index.

History
The Helical Bar and Engineering Company Limited was incorporated as a limited company on 3 July 1919. The company sold its steel reinforcement business in 1986. 

In 2016 the company name was changed to Helical plc.

Operations
The Group is active in London and Manchester and owned a portfolio with total value of £1,108 million as at 31 March 2022.

References

External links
 Official site

Property companies based in London
Real estate companies established in 1919
Companies listed on the London Stock Exchange
1919 establishments in England